Vadim Egoshkin (born 4 January 1970, in Kamchatka Oblast) is a Kazakhstani football coach and a former player.

Honours
Dostyk
Kazakhstan Cup winner: 1993

Yelimay Semipalatinsk
Kazakhstan Premier League champion: 1995
Kazakhstan Cup winner: 1995

Kairat
Kazakhstan Premier League bronze: 1997

References

External links

1970 births
Living people
Soviet footballers
Kazakhstan Premier League players
FC Kairat players
FC Zhetysu players
Kazakhstani footballers
Kazakhstan international footballers
FC Ordabasy players
FC Borysfen Boryspil players
Kazakhstani expatriate footballers
Expatriate footballers in Ukraine
FC CSKA Kyiv players
FC Spartak Semey players
FC Chernomorets Novorossiysk players
Russian Premier League players
Expatriate footballers in Russia
FC Kyzylzhar players
Kazakhstani football managers
Association football goalkeepers